Robert Callaway (born February 14, 1988) is a former professional American football defensive tackle in the National Football League (NFL) for the Detroit Lions and Dallas Cowboys. He played college football at Saginaw Valley State.

Early years
Callaway attended Beecher High School, where he played offensive tackle, defensive tackle and defensive end. He also practiced track.

He accepted a football scholarship from Division-II Saginaw Valley State University. As a freshman, he played in the last 5 games of the season, making 4 starts at defensive tackle and 5 stops.

As a sophomore, he appeared in 5 games with one start, making 2 tackles (0.5 for loss). As a junior, he appeared in 10 games as a backup defensive tackle, tallying 11 tackles.

As a senior, he started all 12 games, registering 25 tackles (6 for loss), 3.5 sacks and 3 blocked kicks.

Professional career

Detroit Lions
Callaway was signed as an undrafted free agent by the Detroit Lions after the 2010 NFL Draft on April 30. On August 7, he was waived and signed to the practice squad two days later.

In 2011, despite posting a sack and a forced fumble in the preseason, he was released by the Lions due to their pre-existing depth at the position on September 3.

Dallas Cowboys
On September 8, 2011, he was signed to the Dallas Cowboys practice squad. He was cut on October 28. He was re-signed on November 1. He was released one day later and re-signed on November 8.

On January 2, 2012, he was signed to a 3-year extension. He was released on September 1 and later signed to the practice squad. On December 8, he was promoted to the active roster. He appeared in 2 games and was declared inactive for the last 2 contests.

In 2013, he suffered a knee injury during organized team activities. He underwent career-ending microfracture surgery and was waived injured on July 11.

References

External links
Saginaw Valley State Cardinals bio

1988 births
Living people
People from Genesee County, Michigan
African-American players of American football
Players of American football from Michigan
American football defensive tackles
Saginaw Valley State Cardinals football players
Dallas Cowboys players
21st-century African-American sportspeople
20th-century African-American people